Lori Lewis is an American opera singer and soprano who is an official member of the Swedish symphonic metal band Therion.

Lewis is also the former singer for Aesma Daeva, a band that toured as a supporting act with Therion in Canada and the US in 2006 and 2007.

Career 

Lewis got her undergraduate degree in Vocal Performance at the Missouri State University, and the graduated degree at the University of Kansas.

In September 2011, Christofer Johnsson, Therion's head, announced that Lewis was named permanent member of the band, becoming then the first female member to have permanent status in the history of the band.

As a permanent member of Therion, Lori participated in the recording of Les Fleurs du Mal, dedicated to the 25th anniversary of the band.

Departure from touring with Therion 
On May 10, 2014, the band announced that Lewis would withdraw from the 2014 tour, performing a last show in Mexico City on May 31. Lewis was replaced by Sandra Laureano as touring member, but remains as member of the band for studio recordings.

Solo career 

In May 2020, Lori announced her first solo album: Carmina Romanus. It has ten songs, including a collaboration with Kristian Niemann (ex-Therion) in Venus (Bringer of Love and Desire). In Mercury - Messenger of Dreams she does a duet with Thomas Vikström (Therion). Most of the lyrics were written by Per Albinsson, author of Beloved Antichrist.

Personal life
Lewis currently resides in Salem, Oregon, and graduated from the University of Kansas.

Discography

 Aesma Daeva – Dawn of the New Athens (Scarecrow, Irond Records) (2007)
 Aesma Daeva – The Thalassa Mixes (2008)
 Therion – Live Gothic (live album) (2008)
 Therion – Sitra Ahra (Nuclear Blast Records) (2010)
 Imperial Vengeance – Black Heart of Empire (2011)
 Therion – Les Fleurs du Mal (2012)
 Therion – Adulruna Rediviva and Beyond (live album) (2014)
 Therion – Beloved Antichrist (2018)
 Solo album – Carmina Romanus (Adulruna) (2020)
 Therion – Leviathan (2021)
 Therion – Leviathan II (2022)

References

External links
 Exclusive interview with Lori Lewis. Author: Jim 2.0. Date: November 8, 2010. (Spanish)
 

Living people
American women heavy metal singers
American operatic sopranos
Musicians from Minneapolis
Therion (band) members
1984 births
21st-century American singers
21st-century American women singers